Bhasin is a surname and clan of the Punjabi Khatris of India. Bhasins are a part of Khukhrain sub-caste/family-group among the Khatris, which also includes the clans of Anand, Chadha, Kohli, Ghai, Sabharwal, Sawhney, Sethi and Suri.

Kamal Shankar Srivastava writes that all Khukrains including Sabharwals were originally found near the banks of Indus and Jhelum river especially in the towns of Pind Dadan Khan, Peshawar and Nowshera. Bhasin translates to "sun".

Prior to the Partition of India in 1947, they were mostly concentrated in the Rawalpindi District of the Punjab Province (1208 families) according to 1881 Census of India conducted by the British. A small number of Bhasins had also immigrated to the city of Lahore.

Notable people 
 Anuradha Bhasin, Indian journalist, editor of Kashmir Times, daughter of Ved Bhasin
 Arjun Bhasin, Indian fashion designer, brother of Niharika Bhasin
 Ashish Bhasin, Indian advertising executive
 Harish Bhasin, appellant in the Canadian contract case law Bhasin v Hrynew
 Jasmin Bhasin (born 1990), Indian actress and model
 Kamla Bhasin (1946–2021), Indian women's rights activist, poet, author and social scientist
 Krishna Bhasin, First female announcer for All India Radio Jammu station 
 Manish Bhasin (born 1976), British sports journalist and television presenter
 Neha Bhasin (born 1982), Indian singer-songwriter
 Om Prakash Bhasin, founder of the Om Prakash Bhasin Award for Science and Technology
 Niharika Bhasin (born 1969), Indian costume designer, sister of Arjun Bhasin
 Nivedita Bhasin (born 1963), Indian airline pilot, the youngest woman to command a commercial jet aircraft
 Pramod Bhasin, Indian business executive, former CEO of Genpact
 Sanjeev Bhasin, Vice Admiral (the 2nd highest rank) in the Indian Navy
 Tahir Raj Bhasin (born 1987), Indian actor
 Ved Bhasin (1929–2015), Indian journalist, founder of Kashmir Times, father of Anuradha Bhasin
 Yagya Bhasin (born 2009), Indian child actor

References

Caste system in India
Surnames
Khatri clans
Khatri surnames
Indian surnames
Punjabi-language surnames
Surnames of Indian origin
Hindu surnames
Punjabi tribes